Actinium-225 (225Ac, Ac-225) is an isotope of actinium. It undergoes alpha decay to francium-221 with a half-life of 10 days, and is an intermediate decay product in the neptunium series (the decay chain starting at 237Np). Except for minuscule quantities arising from this decay chain in nature, 225Ac is entirely synthetic.

The decay properties of actinium-225 are favorable for usage in targeted alpha therapy (TAT); clinical trials have demonstrated the applicability of radiopharmaceuticals containing 225Ac to treat various types of cancer. However, the scarcity of this isotope resulting from its necessary synthesis in cyclotrons limits its potential applications.

Decay and occurrence

Actinium-225 has a half-life of 10 days and decays by alpha emission. It is part of the neptunium series, for it arises as a decay product of neptunium-237 and its daughters such as uranium-233 and thorium-229. It is the last nuclide in the chain with a half-life over a day until the penultimate product, bismuth-209 (half-life  years). The final decay product of 225Ac is stable 205Tl.

As a member of the neptunium series, it does not occur in nature except as a product of trace quantities of 237Np and its daughters formed by neutron capture reactions on primordial 232Th and 238U. It is much rarer than 227Ac and 228Ac, which respectively occur in the decay chains of uranium-235 and thorium-232. Its abundance was estimated as less than  relative to 232Th and around  relative to 230Th in secular equilibrium.

Discovery
Actinium-225 was discovered in 1947 as part of the hitherto unknown neptunium series, which was populated by the synthesis of 233U. A team of physicists from Argonne National Laboratory led by F. Hagemann initially reported the discovery of 225Ac and identified its 10-day half-life. Independently, a Canadian group led by A. C. English identified the same decay scheme; both papers were published in the same issue of Physical Review.

Production
As 225Ac does not occur in any appreciable quantities in nature, it must be synthesized in specialized nuclear reactors. The majority of 225Ac results from the alpha decay of 229Th, but this supply is limited because the decay of 229Th (half-life 7340 years) is relatively slow due to its relatively long half-life. It is also possible to breed 225Ac from radium-226 in the 226Ra(p,2n) reaction. The potential to populate 225Ac using a 226Ra target was first demonstrated in 2005, though the production and handling of 226Ra are difficult because of the respective cost of extraction and hazards of decay products such as radon-222.

Alternatively, 225Ac can be produced in spallation reactions on a 232Th target irradiated with high-energy proton beams. Current techniques enable the production of millicurie quantities of 225Ac; however, it must then be separated from other reaction products. This is done by allowing some of the shorter-lived nuclides to decay; actinium isotopes are then chemically purified in hot cells and 225Ac is concentrated. Special care must be taken to avoid contamination with the longer-lived beta-emitting actinium-227.

For decades, most 225Ac was produced in one facility—the Oak Ridge National Laboratory in Tennessee—further reducing this isotope's availability even with smaller contributions from other laboratories. Additional 225Ac is now produced from 232Th at Los Alamos National Laboratory and Brookhaven National Laboratory. The TRIUMF facility and Canadian Nuclear Laboratories have formed a strategic partnership around the commercial production of actinium-225.

The low supply of 225Ac limits its use in research and cancer treatment. It is estimated that the current supply of 225Ac only allows about a thousand cancer treatments per year.

Applications
Alpha emitters such as actinium-225 are favored in cancer treatment because of the short range (a few cell diameters) of alpha particles in tissue and their high energy, rendering them highly effective in targeting and killing cancer cells—specifically, alpha particles are more effective at breaking DNA strands. The 10-day half-life of 225Ac is long enough to facilitate treatment, but short enough that little remains in the body months after treatment. This contrasts with the similarly investigated 213Bi, whose 46-minute half-life necessitates in situ generation and immediate use. Additionally, 225Ac has a median lethal dose several orders of magnitude greater than 213Bi because of its longer half-life and subsequent alpha emissions from its decay products. Each decay of 225Ac to 209Bi nets four high-energy alpha particles, greatly increasing its potency.

Despite its limited availability, several clinical trials have been completed, demonstrating the effectiveness of 225Ac in targeted alpha therapy. Complexes including 225Ac—such as antibodies labeled with 225Ac—have been tested to target various types of cancer, including leukemia, prostate carcinoma, and breast carcinoma in humans. For example, one experimental 225Ac-based drug has shown effectiveness against acute myeloid leukemia without harming the patient. Further clinical trials of other drugs are underway.

See also
 Isotopes of actinium
 Radium-223

References

Actinium-225
Medical isotopes
Experimental cancer drugs